Aclopus is a genus of beetles, part of the  subfamily Aclopinae.

Species
Aclopus brunneus
Aclopus intermedius
Aclopus parvulus
Aclopus robustus
Aclopus vittatus
Aclopus wuenschei

References

Scarabaeidae
Scarabaeidae genera